Dominique Louis Gabriel Joseph Marie, Prince de La Rochefoucauld-Montbel (born 6 July 1950 in Neuilly-sur-Seine, France) is a member of the French House of La Rochefoucauld and was the Grand Hospitaller of the Sovereign Military Order of Malta (8 years) and before the president of the French Association (14 years). He was also Vice-President during 12 years. He is today Vice-President of the Foundation in France of the Order. He is president of the foundation for Evangelization through the Media (FEM) created in 2008 that supports Aleteia. He is also President of the SMLH Paris 17th (members of the Legion d’Honneur). The La Rochefoucauld de Montbel is a branch of the millenal La Rochefoucauld family (Descendants of Lusignan, famous members including the godfather of King Francois 1er, the frondeur and writer of the Maximes, some cardinals, high ranking militaries and La Rochefoucauld-Liancourt). The Prince branch of the family is closely linked with the Holy Mary apparitions in Pellevoisin (France) and the discovery of the Lascaux Grotte which they owned.

Family

La Rochefoucauld-Montbel is the son of Charles Emmanuel, Prince de La Rochefoucauld-Montbel and of his second wife Joanna Forbes (civil marriage in 1949 and religious marriage in 1997).  He has a twin brother Emmanuel and two younger sisters.  As his half-brother Guy-Emmanuel passed away in 1991, he succeeded to his father as Prince (Fürst) de la Rochefoucauld, a title given to his great-grandfather Jules by the King of Bavaria in 1909. He succeeded also to his father as Comte de La Rochefoucauld-Montbel (French title).

La Rochefoucauld-Montbel married Pascale Marie Subtil 24 January 1984 (civil) and 25 February 1984 (religious) at Connantre.   They have one son Gabriel born in 1987 and two daughters Marie and Anne. They own the Chateau de l’Ormeteau (Reuilly), an old templars base and commandery of the Order of Malta.

Education and career

La Rochefoucauld-Montbel attended Worth School near Crawley, England, the Collège Champittet near Lausanne, and the Institut Florimont near Geneva. He studied economics at the Institut supérieur du commerce de Paris.  

From 1975 to 2004 La Rochefoucauld-Montbel pursued a career in finance, working mostly on the gold market and in exchange transactions.  He manages a real-estate consultancy service and a real-estate assets management company. 
 
La Rochefoucauld-Montbel is president of the SMLH Paris 17th (members of Legion d’Honneur) and member of the Council of the Societé des amis of the Musée de la Légion d'honneur.  He is a member of the Jockey Club and of the Cercle du Bois de Boulogne, as a founder member. He is also chancellor of the « Académie des Psychologues du Goût » and president of the music association of Pellevoisin (France). He is president of the foundation for Evangelization through the Media (FEM) created in 2008 that supports Aleteia.

Order of Malta

In 1982 La Rochefoucauld-Montbel was received into the Order of Malta as a Knight of Honour and Devotion.  In 2008 he took the promise as a Knight in Obedience.  He currently ranks as a Bailiff Knight Grand Cross of Honour and Devotion in Obedience.  

La Rochefoucauld-Montbel has served in a number of positions in the French Association of the Order of Malta: Administrator (1994-1996), Vice-President (1994-2000), President (2000-2014), Vice-President (2014-present).  

He is Vice-President of the French Foundation of the Order of Malta since 2008 and the official representative of the Order of Malta for the Hospital of the Holy Family in Bethlehem from 2009 to 2014.   In 2010 he became a member of the International Hospital Council of the Sovereign Order of Malta in Rome.  

At the Chapter General of the Order of Malta held 30-31 May 2014 in Rome, La Rochefoucauld-Montbel was elected Grand Hospitaller.  He was re-elected at the Chapter General held 1-2 May 2019.  In this capacity he is responsible for the humanitarian affairs and international cooperation of the Order of Malta worldwide. He is director of the Global Fund for Forgotten People.

Honours and decorations

: Knight of the Legion of Honour (12 November 2004)

: Officer of the Legion of Honour (31 December 2014)

: Knight of the National Order of Merit

: Knight of Arts and Letters

: Knight Grand Cross of the Order of Merit of the Italian Republic (9 September 2020)

: Commander of the Order of St. Gregory the Great

: Grand Cross of the Order pro Merito Melitensi

: Collar and Grand Cross of the Order of Isabella the Catholic (29 December 2015)

: Grand Officer of the Order of the Star

House of Bourbon-Two Sicilies: Grand Cross of the Sacred Military Constantinian Order of Saint George

Notes

1950 births
French Roman Catholics
French businesspeople
French nobility
Knights of Malta
Living people
Collège Champittet alumni
Recipients of the Order pro Merito Melitensi